Kiton is an Italian luxury clothing company founded by Ciro Paone in 1968.
As of 2019, Kiton operates 54 monobrand stores worldwide. Its slogan is “Il meglio del meglio  più uno“:  the best of the best plus one.

History
Kiton was founded by Ciro Paone in Arzano, Naples in 1968. The name Kiton derives from "chiton" (Greek: χιτών), a form of tunic  fastened at the shoulder worn by men and women of Ancient Greece and Rome.

In 1995, Kiton launched a line of womenswear. In 2009, Kiton bought the Carlo Barbera woollen mill, which had been founded in 1949 in Biella. In 2013, Kiton launched its retail operations in India. In 2015, Kiton launched its eyewear collection, and opened a 2,500-square-foot store in San Francisco. In 2018, Kiton launched an athleisure collection.

Description
Kiton is the trademark brand of the company Ciro Paone SpA, a company founded in 1956. As of 2019, the company employs about 800 employees and manages 50 stores worldwide. Antonio de Matteis, nephew of Ciro Paone, is CEO of the company. Maria Giovanna Paone, daughter of Ciro Paone, is the vice-president and the creative director of the brand's womenswear, Antonio Paone is the president of Kiton USA.

Kiton have five factories in Arzano, Collecchio, Fidenza, Marcianise and Biella.

See also 
 Made in Italy

References

External links 
 

Companies based in Campania
Luxury brands
Clothing brands of Italy
High fashion brands
Clothing companies established in 1968
Italian suit makers
Italian companies established in 1968
Metropolitan City of Naples